Tijucas is a small (278,4 km2) city in the greater Florianópolis metropolitan area, Santa Catarina, Brazil. It was founded on June 13, 1860. It is located at latitude 27°14'29" South and longitude 48°38'01" West, with an altitude of 2 meters. Its population in 2020 was 39,155 inhabitants. It has an area of 278.91 km2.

Situated on the margins of the River Tijucas and through Tijucas BR 101 road, its main sources of income are the industries of pottery and agriculture.

With its totally flat central area and the interior filled with soft hills and streams, offers its guests a pleasant stay, enjoying nature with a population particularly hospitable.

Culture 
The city has large old houses, some over 100 years old, as is the Mansion of Family Gallotti. The house is one of the oldest noble mansions of the early twentieth century in the state. All materials for the construction of the house, which was completed in 1898, came from Europe and the first residents, the matriarch Chiquinha Gallotti and her family, who dominated the region's economy by working with craft and marketing of native woods, among other commercial activities.

Once a year is held in front of the Matriz Church a great feast, the feast of the Holy Spirit, when performed beyond the people from Tijucas the party has presence of people from other regions, as the cities of Canelinha, Itapema, São João Batista, among others. At Christmas time people may even see a live nativity scene being played out in front of the church. A city with friendly climate and culture of the Azores. Lately is being invested in musicality, usually presenting at times of year-end festivals and various bands.

References

External links 
1. The Official website of the city

Populated coastal places in Santa Catarina (state)
Municipalities in Santa Catarina (state)